The 2023 Porsche Carrera Cup North America, known as the 2023 Porsche Deluxe Carrera Cup North America for sponsorship reasons, is the third season of the Porsche Carrera Cup North America. It is scheduled to begin on March 15 at Sebring International Raceway and end on October 22 at Circuit of the Americas.

Calendar
The calendar was released on February 8, 2023, featuring eight rounds.

Entry list

Results

Championship standings

Points system
Championship points are awarded in each class at the finish of each event. Points are awarded based on finishing positions in the race as shown in the chart below.

Driver's Championship

References

External links
Official website

Porsche Carrera Cup North America
Porsche Carrera Cup North America
Porsche Carrera Cup North America